Cui Peng (born 31 May 1987) is a former Chinese international footballer who played as a midfielder.

Club career
Cui Peng started his football career with Shandong Luneng in 2005 when he earned his first senior team appearance on 9 March 2005 in an  AFC Champions League game against Yokohama Marinos. After several further appearances with the team, he would score his first goal for Shandong against Al-Ittihad in the second leg of a 2005 AFC Champions League game where he scored the second goal with a volley from 30 meters however Shandong lost the game 7–2. By the 2006 season, Cui had established himself as Shandong's first choice right midfielder and would help them win the league title and the Chinese FA Cup.
On 8 July 2014, Cui was loaned out to China League One side Chengdu Tiancheng until 31 December 2014.

On 19 December 2015, Cui transferred to fellow Chinese Super League side Shijiazhuang Ever Bright. He would make his debut on 13 March 2016 in a league game against Hangzhou Greentown that ended in a 1-0 victory. Unfortunately he would sustain an injury during the season and he was unable to aid the club from avoiding relegation, which saw him allowed to return to Shandong on 7 July 2017. On his return to Shandong he was often used as squad player for three seasons before he was allowed to leave on a free transfer to second tier club Kunshan.

International career
Cui would be called up to the senior team to make his debut in a friendly against Thailand on 10 August 2006 in a 4–0 win. While he was called up by the national team for training in 2007, he did not make the squad in the 2007 AFC Asian Cup. Cui was young enough to participate in the 2008 Summer Olympics and was part of the Chinese under-23 national team squad that took part in the tournament where he played in all three group games.

Career statistics
.

Honours

Club
Shandong Luneng
Chinese Super League: 2006, 2008, 2010
Chinese FA Cup: 2006, 2014

References

External links
Player stats at football-lineups website

 
Player stats at Sohu.com

1987 births
Living people
Chinese footballers
Footballers from Dalian
China international footballers
Footballers at the 2008 Summer Olympics
Olympic footballers of China
Shandong Taishan F.C. players
Chengdu Tiancheng F.C. players
Cangzhou Mighty Lions F.C. players
Kunshan F.C. players
Chinese Super League players
China League One players
Footballers at the 2006 Asian Games
Association football midfielders
Asian Games competitors for China